The Ford Ka is a small car manufactured by Ford Motor Company from 1996 to 2016 as a city car and from 2016 to 2021 as a subcompact car. It entered its second generation in 2008, produced by Fiat in Tychy, Poland. A third generation was introduced in 2016.

The first two generations have a three-door hatchback body style, with the first generation also having a two-door convertible version that was marketed as the StreetKa and a sporty hatch version, the SportKa.

The third generation was produced as a five-door hatchback and as a four-door sedan. It was initially only available in Brazil, and later was introduced in India, Italy, Mexico, Spain, South Africa (where it was marketed as the Ford Figo), Argentina, and Poland. European sales ended in 2020, and in 2021, it was taken out of production in Brazil.

Pronunciation
The name Ka has three possible pronunciations. It can be said using a long or short "a", or with the letters pronounced separately. Ford's press office has used all three. According to Auto Trader, Ford "top brass" have given the correct pronunciation as "Ka as in cat".

First generation (BE146; 1996)

The car was introduced on September 11, 1996, as a small and low-cost addition to the Ford range. Developed under the BE146 development code, it was based on the Mark 3 Ford Fiesta platform, but with a completely different exterior design. The design borrowed from Ghia's "Saetta" show car, a roadster designed by Filippo Sapino. The Ka evolved from concept vehicles to production with minor changes. The large, one-piece, moulded bumpers and wheel arches made the vehicle more durable and easier to repair. The vehicle was manufactured on the existing Fiesta production line in Almussafes, Valencia, minimising new model investment costs. The chief program engineer was Kevin O’Neill. The designer of the car was Chris Svensson of Sunderland, who had designed a similar-shaped car when at the Royal College of Art in 1992.

When the Ka was first introduced to the public, it provoked mixed reactions, due to its original and striking New Edge design, overseen by Jack Telnack and executed by Claude Lobo.

Besides the styling, the Ka, like its sister cars Fiesta and Puma, was lauded in the motoring press for its handling. Under Richard Parry-Jones' supervision, the suspension and steering settings allowed for hard cornering and high levels of grip, providing strong handling characteristics.

At launch, the Ka was produced as a single model, with a number of production options, including air conditioning, power steering, height-adjustable driver's seat, adjustable position rear seat with head restraints, passenger airbag, central locking, and power windows. An anti-lock braking system option was added in January 1997.

The car's main drawback was the 1,300 cc overhead valve four-cylinder Endura-E engine, a derivative of the Valencia unit used in all the previous generations of the Fiesta and based on the older "Kent" design, which dated back to the 1960s.  Although not very modern, it provided enough torque to allow relaxed if not spirited driving. In 2002, the Endura-E was replaced by the overhead-cam Duratec engine, with claims of improved fuel efficiency and increased refinement, mostly caused by taller gearing on the cars without air conditioning.

Endura-E engine specs (Ka)  
998 cc (Brazil):
 Power output - 53HP (5250 rpm)
 Torque - 77.2 Nm (4000 rpm)
 Bore - 68.68mm
 Stroke - 67.40mm
 Redline - 5450 rpm
 RPM Limit - 5675 rpm

1297 cc:
 Power output - 60HP (5000 rpm)
 Torque - 104.0 Nm (3500 rpm)
 Bore - 74mm
 Stroke - 75.5mm
 Redline - 5450 rpm
 RPM Limit - 5675 rpm

For the first three years of production, all models had black plastic bumpers to minimise parking damage to paintwork in city environments. These bumpers contained a stabiliser to prevent UV degradation, which made them unsuitable for painting because the paint would not adhere properly. Since many owners wanted body-coloured bumpers, they were introduced in 1999 using different bumper mouldings (without the stabiliser).

The Ka proved highly profitable for Ford despite its low selling price, largely due to low development costs. In 2006, Ford sold 17,000 cars in the United Kingdom. 
In Australia, the Ka was introduced in October 1999 and was on the market until 2002. It was unsuccessful; fewer than 2,000 were sold per year. This was partly due to the lack of an automatic transmission, which is preferred by a large proportion of Australian car buyers. The Ka was also sold in New Zealand between 1999 and 2004, and was replaced by the newer Fiesta.

Markets

United Kingdom 
The Ka was the best-selling car in its class in the United Kingdom for a number of years and commanded around a fifth of the city-car market. The UK model range originally consisted of the base version, the Ka, and the higher specification Ka2, which standardised a number of the options listed above. The Ka2 badge was fitted by dealers. The Ka3 was introduced later. Power steering was added to the base Ka after the first year.

Concurrent with the introduction of body-coloured bumpers, Ka2 and Ka3 were replaced by Ka Collection and the LuxuryKa (later Ka Luxury).

The Luxury version came with a Quickclear heated windscreen, leather seats and interior trim, and standard air conditioning. A "Ka Blue" special edition was also launched in the UK with dark blue bumpers and a silvery-blue dashboard insert, rather than the standard models' silver. The Ka Sun Collection with a full-length fabric folding roof was also added to the range during the summer.

Unique to the UK was the Ford Ka Van variant, produced for BT Group and featuring a bespoke flat plywood floor with rubber overmat and white-ply covers instead of rear windows.

A further line-up revision gave Ka the following trim levels in the United Kingdom: Studio, Style, Style Climate, and Zetec Climate. In 2005, the Sublime model was introduced featuring special leather interior and features not found on other models. It was produced in only very small numbers and is now one of the most sought-after Kas. The SportKa was also added to the range. With the car's impending replacement, in May 2008, a Finale special edition with distinguishing features such as roof decal and black wing mirrors was made available.

Latin America 

From the 1997 launch, and until 2001, the Latin American Ka was substantially similar to the European Ka, differing only in levels of equipment and trim. The main differences from the European model were the very short gearing for the manual transmission (the only transmission available) and the lack of soundproofing, which had been gradually removed annually since 2000 as a way to cut down costs, following the practice of other Brazilian car makers at the time.

In 2001, the Latin American Ka received a midcycle facelift, which left it slightly different, externally, to the European model. The most noticeable difference was at the rear, where the number plate was moved from the bumper to the boot (trunk) lid, and the rear lights were made much taller.

StreetKa and SportKa

In 2003, the Ka brand was diversified, with the addition of a new SportKa featuring a sporty body kit, wider track with stiffened suspension and redesigned 16" (40 cm) alloy wheels. Both models came with slightly widened bumpers front and rear with integral fog lamps. A convertible model called StreetKa also appeared, launched with the help of Australian pop star Kylie Minogue at the Paris Motor Show. It featured a manually folding soft top or an optional detachable hardtop (on the Winter Edition).

StreetKa was designed and built by Pininfarina (the 2000 motor show concept was designed by Ghia, Turin) in Italy, and all StreetKas have sill plates inscribed "Pininfarina". Pininfarina produced 37,076 StreetKas between 2003 and 2005. The build quality of the Streetka was far superior to the standard three-door Ka, with improved rust proofing.

StreetKa came in two equipment levels, basic and luxury. The Basic had cloth seats and air conditioning was an option. The Luxury featured leather seats with matching leather door-card inserts, heated seats, a Thatcham approved alarm along with Ford's PATS immobiliser, air conditioning, and heated door mirrors. Options included upgrading the single CD/radio to an in-dash six-disc CD/radio and additional rear speakers beneath the rollover bars and a heated windscreen, standard on winter models. All models featured remote-control central locking with remote boot release, driver and passenger air bags with passengers air bag deactivation, electric windows and door mirrors, electric headlight aim adjustment, antilock brakes, power steering, front fog lights, racing Puma aluminium gear knob, electric hood cover release, and a tachometer.

The engine used in StreetKa (and SportKa) is called a Duratec, but it is of South African origin, where it is known as the Zetec Rocam. StreetKa features MacPherson struts front and rear and uses unique wider front lower arms (wishbones), giving it exceptional handling. 
The only exterior panel shared with Ka is the bonnet. The front headlights are also shared with Ka, but appear different due to the front bumper covering them partly to change their shape. The interior shares most parts with Ka, except the StreetKa has its facia painted blue rather than silver. Its seats are mounted lower than Ka's and it has aluminium effect detailing.

Both the StreetKa and SportKa received a new  1.6-litre eight-valve Duratec petrol engine, whereas Ka, Ka Collection, and LuxuryKa retained the 1.3-litre Duratec petrol engine. The SportKa was noted for its surprising advertising campaign, "The Ka's Evil Twin", denouncing the Ka's traditionally perceived "cute" design. The StreetKa ceased to be officially on sale in late 2006.

In 2005, all Ka models, including the SportKa and StreetKa, received a slightly updated interior, bringing the cabin back up to date, while still retaining the look and feel of the original. The SportKa continued to be available until 2008. A pink version was produced to promote the new Thunderbirds film, and was supplied by Ford to the movie producer. The Thunderbird movie cars were unveiled at the Birmingham Motor Show. Only eight Pink StreetKas were produced by Ford for the film, five in right-hand drive and three in left-hand drive. All were signed by Sophia Myles (Miss Lady Penelope). The matching StreetKa dress designed by Bruce Oldfield of Ford was later sold in an auction during London Fashion Week to raise money for Barnados.

Motorsport
A Ford Ka rally championship was created in 1998. It has proved to be one of the most popular junior rally championships (Ford Ka Rally Cup) in the UK and Ireland. In 2007, Luke Pinder won the BRC Silverstone Tyre 1400 Championship in a Chris Birkbeck Ford Ka.

A Series based on Ford KA Mk1 1300cc (produced between 2002 and 2008) exists in UK as EnduroKA

Ka Rally Car
Built by the Ford Motorsport (Ford TeamRS) works at Boreham, Essex, The Rally Ka was designed as an entry-level vehicle to compete in a one-make series as part of the British Mintex rally championship. The Ka Championship in 1997 had just four cars in the debut Granite City Rally event. In 1998, 15 competitors undertook the Mintex challenge. Ford's Boreham airfield facility provides a complete build service for competitors wishing to rally Ka. Most of the parts supplied are concerned with strengthening the car for rallying. Uprated engine mounts and suspension bushes are all included, as is a front strut brace. Aluminium sump and fuel tank guards, OZ Rally wheels, and a Safety Devices bolt-in roll cage are all either fitted by the Boreham works or supplied to individual teams. Performance-enhancing modifications are limited to the addition of a Rally spec engine control unit, camshaft and 4-into-2-into-1 extractor set attached to a free-flowing exhaust. A limited-slip differential and heavier clutch plate are also available. A competition brake package consisting of Mintex pads gripping vented front brake rotors and stronger rear drums is homologated for Rally Ka. Replacing the original shock absorbers is a set of four remote-reservoir Proflex coil-over struts adjustable for compression and rebound damping. These are allied to a lowering kit and adjustable spring platforms to give Ka competitors a wide range of suspension settings including ride height. Inside, the Rally Ka is all business. In true rally fashion, gone are all but the essentials - the two central eyeball vents are replaced by a tachometer and auxiliary gauge. Even the replacement panels in the dashboard, which support the fire extinguisher button and extra switches and gauges required in a rally car are listed in the Boreham parts schedule. A deeply dished rally steering wheel, competition seats, and harnesses are all supplied from the kit, and replacements are not allowed.

Second generation (2008)

European version (B420) 

In 2008, the European Ka was replaced with a model developed and produced for Ford by Fiat in conjunction with Fiat's own 500 vehicle. The car was built in Fiat's Tychy, Poland, factory alongside the Fiat 500, Fiat Panda, and Lancia Ypsilon. Production started on 18 July 2008.

Based on the Fiat 500 architecture, its interior offers optional Bluetooth phone connection, wireless voice control, a USB port, a CD Radio, MP3, an AUX connector, steering-wheel audio controls, and a speaker system consisting of six speakers, a subwoofer, and an amplifier.

Both engines come with sub-120 g/km CO2 emissions (119 for the petrol and 112 for the diesel). Both engines are supplied from Fiat.

The Ka featured shock absorption revised from the Fiat 500 along with a rear antiroll bar enabling 30% softer springs and accordingly retuned dampers to improve ride performance over uneven road surfaces. Some of these improvements were subsequently adopted on Fiat 500 Abarth and Fiat 500C models. The Ka uses an electrically assisted steering system, which makes the steering much lighter and more energy efficient than its predecessor.

The second-generation Ka has an overall Euro NCAP safety rating of four stars, with standard driver and passenger single-stage front airbags, ABS, immobiliser, hazard warning lights, and remote central locking (except Studio version in UK). In addition, it has front side airbags and curtain airbags and electronic stability control with hydraulic brake assist and hill launch assist that come at an extra cost.

The Ka made its debut in the 22nd James Bond film Quantum of Solace and was unveiled in October 2008's Paris Motor Show.

Production ended on 20 May 2016.

Ka Individual 

Three "Ford Individual packs" were introduced with special characteristics each (in both the interior and exterior design), called Tattoo, Grand Prix, and Digital. the Tattoo was replaced in 2011 by the Metal. All Individual models are based on the Zetec.

Latin American version (B402) 

The Latin American market received a separate model, which is based on the first-generation Ka chassis with redesigned exterior and interior design, adopting Ford's "Kinetic Design". It was introduced in December 2007 in Brazil, and went on sale in early January 2008 as a 2009 model year. The car was also exported to other markets in Latin America. However, it was not available in Mexico.

Developed under the B402 project code, the model was designed and engineered in Brazil. During development, 123 test prototypes were used, and involving 5,145 engineering tests and 430,000 km of durability tests. In the manufacturing plant at São Bernardo do Campo, the project included the replacement of 160 robots in the assembly line, as well as measuring machines and test stations.

In comparison to the original Ka, this model has a longer rear overhang and a redesigned rear seat to accommodate a fifth passenger. The boot capacity was increased from the previous generation 186 liters to a 263 liters.

It was available with 1.0-litre and 1.6-litre Zetec Rocam petrol flex engines, both are four-cylinder units.

In 2011, Ford presented a mid-cycle facelifted version following the Kinect concept car. In Brazil, only the Sport version offers a 1.6-litre engine.

Safety 
The Ka in its most basic Latin American configuration with no airbags received 1 star for adult occupants and 3 stars for toddlers from Latin NCAP in 2011.

Third generation (B562; 2014) 

Developed by Ford Brazil, the Ford Ka Concept was unveiled in Brazil in November 2013. The production version of this new Ford Ka appeared in July 2014, in hatchback and sedan body styles, with the first units arriving in Brazil in September and October 2014 respectively. The next market where it was launched was India, where the sedan made its debut as the new Ford Figo Aspire in August 2015, with the hatchback arriving (as the new Ford Figo) a month later. It was launched in Europe (as the Ka+) in June 2016.

The new model was based on Ford's global B platform, sharing its underpinnings with the Fiesta supermini, and embodies Ford's Kinetic 2.0 design theme.

The latter is paired with Ford's six-speed automatic PowerShift transmission, while for the rest a five-speed manual option is available.

It features equipment such as the Ford's MyKey, MyDock, and SYNC systems, steering-mounted controls, automatic climate control, power-fold mirrors, keyless entry, electronic stability control, cruise control (in Europe), up to six airbags and high-strength steel body structure.

It was then launched in Mexico in September 2015, and in South Africa one month later. In March 2016, it was also introduced in Argentina.

The new Ka was produced at Ford's factories in Camaçari, Brazil, (from where it is exported to Argentina) until January 13, 2021, and in Sanand, Gujarat, India, (from where it was exported to Mexico, South Africa and Europe).

The Ka+ was discontinued in Europe in September 2019.

Markets

Europe 
The third-generation Ka was marketed in Europe as the Ka+. It was introduced in June 2016, with deliveries starting later that year. The '+' in the name shows the fact how Ford sees this as a budget B-segment car, rather than an A-segment car.

Latin America 
The new Ford Ka was introduced in the 2014 São Paulo Motor Show, becoming available on the market in August of that year and presented at the 2015 Buenos Aires Motor Show. The Ford Ka adopts the "Kinetic" design, presenting a more aggressive style, and it is slightly bigger than the previous model, adopting a five-door body, occupying the site of the former Ford Ka and Ford Fiesta One.

Also it adds a new body variant, a four-door sedan, called Ka+. Gearbox options are limited to the well-known five-speed IB5+ for both the 1.0- and the 1.5-litre variants.

According to local press, the current 1.0 L version of the new 2014 Ka is the most economical compact car without a turbocharged engine (1.0 L TSI), achieving up to 12 km/L of  ethanol (E100) in the city of São Paulo. E33 fuel (Brazilian standard gasoline specification) economy facts had not been publicized, although owners claim it does about 1.0 to 2.5 km/L more than with E100.

Its Sigma 1.5 L-equipped version had been well received by the Brazilian market due to its relatively vigorous launches and good torque at low and midrange engine speeds.

Safety
In November 2015, a Ka+ model in its most basic Latin American configuration with two standard front airbags and standard anti-lock braking system with electronic brakeforce distribution was tested by Latin NCAP and was awarded four stars out of five for adult occupants and 3 stars for toddlers. In a frontal impact,the driver's head and chest were considered to receive adequate protection, the passenger's head and chest received good protection, while the driver's and passenger's knee areas received marginal protection. The bodyshell was rated as stable and was capable of withstanding further loading.

The Ka+ in its most basic Latin American configuration with 2 airbags and no ESC received 0 stars for adult occupants and 3 stars for toddlers from Latin NCAP in 2017 (one level above 2015).

The updated Ka+ in its most basic Latin American configuration and no ESC received 3 stars for adult occupants and 4 stars for toddlers from Latin NCAP in 2018.

The Ka+ in its most basic Latin American configuration with 2 airbags, driver pretensioner and no ESC received 0 stars from Latin NCAP under its new protocol in 2020 (one level above 2018, similar to Euro NCAP 2014).

In March 2017, Euro NCAP released the results of the tests performed on the Ka+ in its standard European configuration and it scored three out of five stars. For the adult occupants, it received a 73% rating, for the child occupant, a 61% rating, for the pedestrian, a 57% rating, and the safety assist category, a 29% rating. The car's performance in the tests was rated as "mediocre", being criticized for lacking rear seatbelt pretensioners and load limiters, poor chest protection in the full-width frontal crash test, and the lack of autonomous braking technology.

Advertising controversy 
In 2004, two commercials advertising the Ford SportKa in the UK proved controversial when they received complaints for their content. The first commercial included a parked SportKa as a pigeon flies toward it, presumably to befoul it. When the pigeon is within range, the SportKa violently pops its hood, bashing the bird to its death.

The second advertisement had the SportKa opening its sunroof as if enticing a nearby cat to peer in. When the cat climbed on the roof and peeked inside, the sunroof closed and beheaded the cat.

Both commercials concluded with the graphic, "Ford SportKa. The Ka's evil twin." After many complaints, these advertisements were removed from air and not shown again.

Notes

References

External links

 Official website (archived)

Ka
City cars
Euro NCAP superminis
Latin NCAP superminis
Front-wheel-drive vehicles
Ford B3 platform
Hot hatches
Rally cars
2000s cars
Cars introduced in 1996
2010s cars